"My Mind Right", released in 2000, is the first single from Memphis Bleek's second studio album, The Understanding and Backstage: A Hard Knock Life. The music video (directed by Nzingha Stewart) features cameos from Jay-Z, Damon Dash, Caddillac Tah, Ja Rule and Fabolous. Initially, the song was not a major hit and did not receive much airplay. Memphis Bleek recruited Jay-Z and Beanie Sigel to remix the song. This version of the song became a huge hit during the summer of 2000. The single would be Bleek's biggest hit until the next two songs were released from the album.

Charts

References

2000 singles
Memphis Bleek songs
Roc-A-Fella Records singles
2000 songs
Songs written by Jay-Z